Chad Knight (born 1976) is an American contemporary artist and professional skateboarder based in Portland, Oregon.

Life and influences
Chad Knight is a native of Westerville, Ohio. and an alumnus of the MiraCosta College. Knight was influenced by the Renaissance and Baroque masters such as Claudio Coello, Peter Paul Rubens, and Caravaggio as well as contemporary digital artists including Virgil Abloh and  Archan Nair, among others. Chad Knight is a resident of Portland, Oregon.

Professional skateboarding (1996 - 2011)
Chad Knight attained professional status in around 1996 and played for different skateboarding teams including H-Street, Maple team, Osiris Crew and 1031. He also worked as a skateboard coach training amateur skateboarders in the US and Japan.

Knight competed as a professional skateboarder on American Gladiators (2008 TV series) and also appeared on The Guide by Scion Show as a skateboarder and guest.

Visual artist (2011 - present)
After retiring from professional skateboarding, Knight began working as a designer for different brands including Vans, DC Shoes and Nike. Since 2013, Knight created a broad range of digital artwork exploring themes of contemporary architecture, engineering and sculpture designed in 3D programs. Natural landscapes and femininity also play a reoccurring role throughout his works.

In September 2018, his Rose Gold installation was popularized by Lindsay Lohan when she posted the image on her Instagram as "a real location" and caused confusion among Knight's fans who tried to find the sculpture. Chad Knight is the head of the 3D design division at Nike.

Selective works and exhibitions
Cover art for Doja Cat's Kiss Me More single (2021)
Abandoned Potential (Love on the Brain Exhibition, 2021)
Wild Life, The White Room Gallery (Bridgehampton, March - April, 2021)
Gaia awakens (Museum of Digital Art)
Business Man of The Apocalypse (Fusion Art, 2018)
Marcel Katz Art Exhibition (2018)

References

1976 births

Living people

21st-century American artists

American installation artists

Artists from New York City